David McKenzie Downie (March 11, 1909 – March 18, 1963) was a Canadian ice hockey player who played 11 games in the National Hockey League with the Toronto Maple Leafs during the 1932–33 season. The rest of his career, which lasted from 1928 to 1945, was spent in various minor leagues. Downie was born in Burk's Falls, Ontario.

Career statistics

Regular season and playoffs

External links
 

1909 births
1963 deaths
Boston Cubs players
Canadian ice hockey centres
Ice hockey people from Ontario
People from Parry Sound District
Philadelphia Rockets players
Portland Buckaroos players
Seattle Ironmen players
Seattle Olympics players
Seattle Seahawks (ice hockey) players
Syracuse Stars (IHL) players
Toronto Maple Leafs players
Victoria Cubs players
Windsor Bulldogs (1929–1936) players